Turkey was represented by 20 athletes,  among them 12 women, at the 2010 European Athletics Championships held between July 27 and August 1 in Barcelona, Spain.

Turkey ranked fifth in the countries' medal table. With three gold and one silver medals that have been won all by female athletes, it was Turkey's most successful European championship. Placing two athletes at the first and second positions at one event, Women's 5000 metres, crowned Turkey's participation.

Participants

Results

Men
Track and road events

Women
Track and road events

Field events

Medalists

References 
 Participants list (men)
 Participants list (women)

2010
Nations at the 2010 European Athletics Championships
European Athletics Championships